Imre Rietveld is a retired Dutch-born Danish badminton player who won six French Open titles between 1963 and 1967. 

In 1967 she married Knud Aage Nielsen, a Danish badminton player. After that she competed for Denmark as Imre Rietveld Nielsen or Imre Nielsen, winning the Belgian International and Denmark Open in 1969, as well as a silver medal at the 1970 European Badminton Championships.

References

Year of birth missing (living people)
Living people
Dutch female badminton players
Danish female badminton players